"The longest suicide note in history" is an epithet originally used by United Kingdom Labour MP Gerald Kaufman to describe his party's 1983 general election manifesto, which emphasised socialist policies in a more profound manner than previous such documents—and which Kaufman felt would ensure that the Labour Party (then in opposition) would fail to win the election.

Document

The New Hope for Britain was a 39-page booklet which called for unilateral nuclear disarmament; higher personal taxation for the rich; withdrawal from the European Economic Community; abolition of the House of Lords; and the re-nationalisation of recently privatised industries such as British Aerospace and the British Shipbuilders Corporation. The manifesto was based on an earlier and much longer policy paper with a similar title, Labour's Plan: the New Hope for Britain.

The epithet referred not only to the orientation of the policies, but also to their marketing. Labour leader Michael Foot decided as a statement on internal democracy that the manifesto would consist of all resolutions arrived at in its party conference.

The document's more left-wing policy proposals, along with the popularity gained by Conservative Prime Minister Margaret Thatcher over the successful outcome of the Falklands War and the division of the opposition vote between the left-wing Labour Party and the centrist Social Democratic Party – Liberal Alliance, composed of breakaway Labour MPs on the right wing of the party, contributed to a victory with a substantial majority in Parliament for the right-wing Conservative Party Government. The defeat, Labour's worst result since the 1918 general election, led to a turning point in the history of the party, which thereafter gradually moved to the right under the leadership of Neil Kinnock and then under the leadership of Tony Blair in the 1990s rebranded itself as "New Labour" and Third Way. Blair led Labour back to government in a landslide victory at the 1997 general election, fourteen years and two general election defeats later.

Other uses of the phrase
It has subsequently been used by Peter Gutmann in his paper "A Cost Analysis of Windows Vista Content Protection" to describe the digital rights management schemes in the Windows Vista operating system.

Dutch VVD politician Mark Rutte used the phrase in reference to the election programme of the Dutch Labour Party, during the May 2010 parliamentary election campaign, deliberately echoing Kaufman.

In the United States, The Washington Post columnist Charles Krauthammer compared the 2012 Republican House Budget to the manifesto (in terms of comparable unpopularity) and then remarked of the American House Budget, "At 37 footnotes, it might be the most annotated suicide note in history." Neoconservative writer David Frum compared The Path to Prosperity, proposed by congressman Paul Ryan, in a similar light, saying "This is how a great political party was impelled to base a presidential campaign on the Ryan plan—a plan that has now replaced the 1983 manifesto of the British Labour Party as "the longest suicide note in history." However, this title since 2010 belongs to Mitchell Heisman's 1900 pages long book.

Labour's decision in 2015 to engrave promises for the upcoming election on a large stone monument nicknamed the "EdStone" (after leader Ed Miliband) was within hours dubbed the "heaviest suicide note in history". George Eaton predicted that immediately after the snap 2017 election, politicians and political writers would dismiss For the Many, Not the Few, Labour's left-wing manifesto in that campaign, as "the new 'longest suicide note in history'" (it was 128 pages long) but its policy proposals would remain popular with Labour members as well as voters as they increased their vote share by 9.6%.

See also
 List of Labour Party (UK) general election manifestos

References

External links
 Labour Party Manifesto 1983 (Archived)

English phrases
History of the Labour Party (UK)
Party platforms
British political phrases
1983 United Kingdom general election
Michael Foot
1983 in British politics
1983 documents
1983 neologisms